Wilhelm Blanke (11 March 1873 – 16 April 1936) was a German painter and lithographer.

Born to Johanna Karoline (née Neumann) and Ernst Johann Blanke in Kargowa, he was trained as a decorative painter by his eldest brother. He later moved to Berlin to work on his profession. From 1895 to 1930, Blanke lived and worked in Steglitz. Blanke often participated in art exhibitions.

In the 1920s, his art reflected an Art Deco taste. After an art exhibition in 1931, art critic  called Blanke "one of the greatest masters of Berlin painting," praising how "every brushstroke 'sits' with him," and complimenting how he juxtaposes colors "in the most daring way." Indeed, Blanke was noted for his use of color in his work.

He had a son, Henry, born in 1901.

Gallery

References

Further reading

1873 births
1936 deaths
19th-century German painters
20th-century German painters
Artists from Berlin
German lithographers
People from Steglitz-Zehlendorf
People from the Province of Posen